The 255th Infantry Division was an infantry division of the German Heer during World War II.

History 
The 255th Infantry Division was formed on 26 August 1939, the day of German mobilization, as part of the fourth Aufstellungswelle in Döbeln in Wehrkreis VI (Dresden). The initial commander of the 255th Infantry Division was Wilhelm Wetzel, who assumed his post on 26 August 1939.

The division spent the first months of the war in the Protectorate of Bohemia and Moravia, until it was called to the Battle of France in April 1940. After German victory in that campaign, the 255th Infantry Division was on occupation duty in Belgium in June, in the Nantes region between July and August, and in the Bordeaux sector between September 1940 and February 1941.

In March 1941, the 255th Infantry Division was called to occupied Poland in preparation for Operation Barbarossa. The division crossed into the Soviet Union in June and subsequently fought at Brest, Pinsk, Gomel, Smolensk, and Vyazma. At the end of the year, the division assisted in the defense against the Soviet winter campaign of 1941–42.

On 12 January 1942, the 255th Infantry Division changed commanders for the only time in its history, with Walter Poppe replacing Wetzel. Poppe would hold his command post until the dissolution of the division. In early 1942, the division fought in the Gzhatsk sector before a transfer to the southern part of the Eastern Front after Germany's February 1943 defeat at the Battle of Stalingrad. It fought in the Third Battle of Kharkov and Operation Citadel.

In August 1943, the 255th Infantry Division absorbed the survivors of the battered 332nd Infantry Division.

On 2 November 1943, the 255th Infantry Division was formally downgraded to a Kampfgruppe strength formation, dubbed Division Group 255, as a result of the large casualties sustained.

In February 1944, Division Group 255 was trapped in the Korsun–Cherkassy Pocket and subsequently destroyed.

The division was known by the nickname Green Dot division due to its divisional insignia.

Superior formations

Noteworthy individuals 

 Wilhelm Wetzel, divisional commander between August 1939 and January 1942.
 Walter Poppe, divisional commander between January 1942 and February 1944.

References 

Infantry divisions of Germany during World War II
Military units and formations established in 1939
Military units and formations disestablished in 1944